Duncanville is an American animated sitcom created by Amy Poehler, Mike Scully and Julie Scully for the Fox Broadcasting Company. The series features the voices of Poehler, Ty Burrell, Riki Lindhome, Zach Cherry, Yassir Lester, Betsy Sodaro, Rashida Jones, Joy Osmanski, and Wiz Khalifa. The series premiered in the United States on February 16, 2020.

In June 2022, Fox cancelled the series after three seasons. The series concluded on October 18, 2022.

Premise
Duncanville centers on the life of Duncan Harris, an average 15-year-old boy who is always one step away from making a bad decision. Along with Duncan lives his mother, Annie, a meter maid, who dreams of being a detective someday and always has to watch Duncan from screwing up; his father, Jack, who tries to be a better father figure to Duncan than his own father was to him; his younger 12-year-old sister Kimberly, who is an awkward and angsty tween going through normal teen-phases; and his other adopted Asian sister Jing, who is an intelligent 5-year-old who is always giving Duncan advice. Mia is Duncan's on-and-off crush. Other recurring characters include Duncan's friends, Yangzi, Bex, and Wolf; the Harris' neighbor, Helen Diggins, and Annie's con-man brother, Stan Theman.

Cast

Main

 Amy Poehler as:
 Duncan, an average teen who is average in every way who has a dream world where he is everything. He has a crush on Mia and refers to his best friends for advice and help.
 Annie, mother to Duncan, Kimberly, and Jing, and Jack's wife who is a meter maid that strives to be a detective.
 Ty Burrell as Jack, the rock-obsessed plumber dad who tries to be a better father than his father had been.
 Riki Lindhome as Kimberly, Duncan's angsty, awkward, Wiccan 12-year-old sister with a midriff shirt and purple-dyed hair who struggles to be popular in middle school but fails and takes it out on Duncan.
 Zach Cherry as Wolf, Duncan's monotonous friend and the object of Kimberly's affection. He has issues at home and acts aloof and disinterested in things.
 Yassir Lester as Yangzi, Duncan's friend who supports various brands on Twitter and thus gets a lot of free stuff from these brands. He is also a trendsetter. Yangzi is physically based on Lester.
 Betsy Sodaro as:
 Bex, Duncan's Catholic tomboy friend who is seen as one of the boys. She later rebuffs this and says how could she be a boy when she has boobs. Bex is physically based on Sodaro. The third season episode "(Work) Marriage Story" reveals her name is short for Elizabex.
 Octavia, Bex's grandmother who is oblivious to her granddaughter and her friends' shenanigans and occasionally is pulled into their schemes. She is also apparently a war veteran.
 Joy Osmanski as Jing (seasons 2–3; recurring, season 1), Duncan and Kimberly's adopted five-year-old Asian little sister who has an open crush on Duncan, though she loses romantic interest in the second season.
 Rashida Jones as Mia (seasons 2–3; recurring, season 1), Duncan's friend and secret crush who is very liberal and likes hanging out with Duncan and his friends.
 Wiz Khalifa as Mr. Mitch (seasons 2–3; recurring, season 1), the relatable, immature but rather likeable, teacher who teaches Duncan, Yangzi, Mia, Wolf, and Bex. He has a dog named Mavis.

Recurring
 Kathy Najimy as:
 Mayor Jen, the corrupted Mayor of Oakdale.
 Helen Diggins, the Harrises' constantly inebriated and sexually frustrated neighbor.
 Natalie Palamides as:
 Bradley, Jing's friend and classmate, a precocious toddler who gives marriage and philosophical advice.
 Claire, Kimberly's nerdy best friend.
 Lil' Joey, Jing's friend and classmate, a toddler who talks with a New York-Italian accent.
 James Adomian as:
 Coach Walters, Duncan's gym teacher at Oakdale High School.
 Hal, the manager of a hardware store called Hal's Plumbing Supplies.
 Jason Schwartzman as Stan Themen, Annie's brother, whom she believes is a bad influence on the kids.
 Gerald McRaney as Dick Harris, Jack's father, who frequently berates Jack.
 John Viener as Neil LaDouche, a rich guy who Annie chases for his unpaid parking ticket.

Episodes

Series overview

Season 1 (2020)

Season 2 (2021)

Season 3 (2022)

Production
On August 17, 2017, it was reported that Fox had ordered a script and pilot presentation for an animated comedy developed by Amy Poehler and written by Poehler, Mike Scully, and Julie Scully.

On October 26, 2018, it was announced that the network had ordered a 13-episode series, with featured voices Poehler, Rashida Jones, and Wiz Khalifa. On May 8, 2019, Ty Burrell was announced as a series regular, and on June 6, 2019, Riki Lindhome was announced as a regular.

The series is executive produced by Poehler through Paper Kite Productions, the Scullys through Scullys, and Dave Becky through 3 Arts Entertainment. Production companies also involved with the series include Bento Box Entertainment, Universal Television, Fox Entertainment, and 20th Television Animation.

In April 2020, the series joined the rest of Fox's Animation Domination lineup in a partnership with Caffeine for the AniDom Beyond Show, a recap series hosted by Andy Richter. The hour-long program featured interviews with guests and live interactivity with fans online, with recaps for the episodes that aired through April and May. The Duncanville episode aired on April 16, 2020 featuring Mike Scully and his wife Julie Thacker Scully. On May 18, 2020, John Viener joined the series with other writers from the Fox Animation Domination lineup.

On April 6, 2020, the series was renewed for a second season which premiered on May 23, 2021. On July 16, 2020, Jones, Osmanski, and  Khalifa were promoted to series regulars for the second season. On April 6, 2021, ahead of the second season premiere, Fox renewed the series for a third season. The third season premiered on May 1, 2022.

On June 26, 2022, Andy Lee and Mike Scully confirmed on Twitter that the series would move to Hulu to air its last six episodes. On June 30, 2022, Fox cancelled the series after three seasons, but it is being shopped to other outlets. The final six episodes were released on October 18, 2022 on Hulu.

Release
The series is available to stream on Hulu, and for purchase on YouTube and iTunes.

In Canada, the series aired on Citytv, airing new episodes in simulcast with Fox.

On November 24, 2019, NBCUniversal Global Distribution announced the series was picked up for broadcast in Australia on the Nine Network and debuted on June 4, 2020 on 9Go!. However though, season 2 moved to Nine's free streaming on demand service 9Now in September 2022.

On January 14, 2020, the series was picked up for broadcast in the United Kingdom on Channel 4. It premiered on March 27, 2020, before moving to E4 for season 2, which debuted on October 20, 2021.

The series debuted in Latin America on Fox Channel on August 30, 2020.

In France, the first season is streaming on Amazon Prime Video since November 6, 2020.

In Italy, the series debuted on Italia 1 on January 11, 2021, but was removed from the schedule after only two episodes due to low ratings. However, it was brought back on June 13, 2021, with new episodes airing Saturdays at midnight until July 10 of the same year. As of today, Duncanville is airing Mondays on Italia 2 starting September 5th with reruns the next day.

In Poland, the series debuted on Fox Comedy on February 6, 2021.

In Latin America the show is available to stream on Star+.

Reception

Critical response
On Rotten Tomatoes, the series has an approval rating of 91% based on 11 reviews, with an average rating of 6.30/10. The website's critics consensus reads, "Amy Poehler lends her buoyant pipes to dual roles in Duncanville, a modest animated comedy that gets a lot of mileage out of its colorful palette and daydream flourishes." On Metacritic, it has a weighted average score of 64 out of 100 based on 6 reviews, indicating "generally favorable reviews."

Robyn Bahr of The Hollywood Reporter praised the series for its humor, stating it contains smart joke-telling and manages to be pleasant, and complimented the performances of the voice actors, while calling the main character nondescript, stating, "Duncanville is another family-friendly comedy that seems about as connected to today's youth as its Groupon jokes seem relevant to 2020. There's something particularly '90s about this sitcom that might be intended to feel nostalgic, but really comes off as retrograde." Sulgana Misra of The A.V. Club gave "Pilot" a B, found the series funny and entertaining, praised Poehler's charm and the family dynamics of the show, but criticized the main character's lack of interesting motivation. Ben Travers of  IndieWire gave the show's first two episodes a B− grade, stated Duncanville has potential despite being a sitcom about a white working-class family, writing, "Filled with good ideas, appealing designs, and a strong cast, the half-hour comedy has enough potential to warrant keeping track of, while we wait to see how its rounded edges are sharpened into a singular vision." Melissa Camacho of Common Sense Media rated the series 3 out of 5 stars, writing, "Duncanville is an animated sitcom about an average teenager living life with his family and friends. It has some sex jokes and crude language, and characters argue and hurl insults. [...] References to things like Twizzlers, Groupon, and Papa John's Pizza are common. Movies, music albums, and characters from a range of popular culture are heavily incorporated into the story, too."

Ratings

Overall

Season 1

Season 2

Season 3

Accolades

Notes

References

External links
 Duncanville on Fox
 Duncanville on Hulu
 

2020 American television series debuts
2022 American television series endings
2020s American adult animated television series
2020s American satirical television series
2020s American teen sitcoms
American animated sitcoms
American adult animated comedy television series
Animated television series about dysfunctional families
English-language television shows
Fox Broadcasting Company original programming
Teen animated television series
Television series created by Amy Poehler
Television series by Paper Kite Productions
Television series by Fox Television Animation
Television series by 3 Arts Entertainment
Television series by 20th Century Fox Television
Television series by Universal Television
Television series by Fox Entertainment
Television shows set in Massachusetts